Lloyd Oscar Valberg (14 April 1922 – 26 March 1997) was the first person from Singapore to compete at the Olympics when he went to the 1948 Summer Olympic Games held in London, United Kingdom.

Early years 
He took up the high jump when he was 17, and in 1947 he broke the Singapore record with a jump of 1.87m.

Olympic career 
He qualified for the high jump final at the 1948 Summer Olympics where he finished 14th.

Representing Malaya, he finished seventh in the 1950 British Empire Games 120 yards hurdles and eleventh in the high jump.

He finished third in the 110 metres hurdles at the 1951 Asian Games, while representing Singapore.

Family 
He was a grand-uncle to Singapore's first Olympic gold medalist, Joseph Schooling, who beat Michael Phelps in the 100m Butterfly in the 2016 Summer Olympics. It was Lloyd who inspired Schooling to compete in the Olympics.

References

External links
 
 
 
 

1922 births
1997 deaths
Athletes (track and field) at the 1948 Summer Olympics
Olympic athletes of Singapore
Singaporean male high jumpers
Singaporean male hurdlers
Athletes (track and field) at the 1950 British Empire Games
Commonwealth Games competitors for Malaya
Asian Games medalists in athletics (track and field)
Athletes (track and field) at the 1951 Asian Games
Asian Games bronze medalists for Singapore
Medalists at the 1951 Asian Games